The 1990 United States Senate election in Idaho was held on November 6, 1990. Republican Rep. Larry Craig defeated Democratic former state legislator Ron Twilegar for the seat of U.S. Senator Jim McClure, who did not seek reelection.

Major Candidates

Republican 
 Larry Craig, U.S. Representative
 Jim Jones, Idaho Attorney General

Democratic 
 Ron Twilegar, former State Senator
 David C. Steed

Primary Results 

Both primary elections were held on May 22, 1990.

Republican

Democratic

General Election Results

See also 
 1990 United States Senate elections

References 

1990 Idaho elections
Idaho
1990